Ondřej Vencl (born 7 November 1993) is a Czech footballer who plays for MFK Chrudim as a defender.

Club career

FC Nitra
Vencl made his professional debut for FC Nitra against FC ViOn Zlaté Moravce on August 11, 2017.

References

External links
 FC Nitra official club profile
 
 Futbalnet profile

1993 births
Living people
Czech footballers
Association football defenders
FK Pardubice players
FC Nitra players
Slovak Super Liga players
Expatriate footballers in Slovakia
Sportspeople from Pardubice
SV Horn players
2. Liga (Austria) players
Expatriate footballers in Austria
Czech expatriate sportspeople in Austria
MFK Chrudim players
Czech National Football League players
FK Kolín players